Bert and Ernie's Great Adventures (originally promoted as The Adventures of Bert and Ernie) is an animated children's television series developed by Sesame Workshop in which clay animated versions of Bert and Ernie use their imaginations to travel to strange places and into entertaining situations. The shorts are shown in the United States as inserts on Sesame Street (first appearing in season 39). Internationally, the shorts are shown as a stand-alone series in various overseas markets (the first season debuting in September 2008). The animation for the series was produced by Italy's Misseri Studio. Two seasons of 26 five-minute episodes each had been produced.
The "Secret Agents" episode has received the Gold Award for the Children's Animation category at the 2009 World Media Festival, as well as being a selection at the 2009 Annecy Animation Festival.
Production of these segments began on December 11, 2006 before their official airing in 2008.

Format
Each episode begins with Bert and Ernie climbing into their beds for a good night's sleep. Suddenly, Bert's bed starts shaking and tapping, and Ernie hops aboard as the bed flies out of their apartment and into their next great adventure. Each adventure has Bert and Ernie in a new location and a new situation. Sometimes they're accompanied by Bert's trusted pigeon-friend Bernice, or Ernie's toy Rubber Duckie. Often they encounter new and old friends, and also adversaries, along the way.

Voices
 Eric Jacobson as Bert
 Steve Whitmire as Ernie 
 Stephanie D'Abruzzo as various characters
 Joey Mazzarino as various characters
 Tyler Bunch as various characters
Kevin Clash as Elmo

Episodes
 "Tiny Town" (December 11, 2006)
 "Pirates" (August 13, 2007)
 "Planet Bert" (August 18, 2007)
 "Bakers" (September 3, 2007)
 "Cavemen" (October 2, 2007)
 "Rainforest" (October 10, 2007)
 "Penguin" (October 20, 2007)
 "Wild West" (October 31, 2007)
 "Three Wishes" (November 1, 2007)
 "Inventors" (November 5, 2007)
 "Museum Guards" (September 27, 2008)
 "Mountain Climbers" (July 22, 2008)
 "Deep Sea" (February 23, 2008)
 "Pigeonia" (February 23, 2008)
 "Ernlock Holmes" (February 23, 2008)
 "Superheroes" (July 22, 2008)
 "Kung Fu" (February 23, 2008)
 "Wizards" (February 23, 2008)
 "Beach" (July 1, 2008)
 "Invisible" (July 20, 2008)
 "Piano Movers" (July 26, 2008)
 "Cliptecs" (February 23, 2008)
 "Knights" (September 6, 2008)
 "Secret Agents" (October 11, 2008)
 "Rodeo" (February 9, 2009)
 "Chariot" (February 20, 2009)
 "Maltese Ducky" (November 12, 2009)
 "Flower Shop" (August 1, 2010)
 "Duckie Search" (August 8, 2010)
 "Dr. Bird Whistle" (December 15, 2010)
 "Wise Old Duck" (December 22, 2010)
 "Raincloud" (Christmas Day 2010)
 "Car Mechanics" (March 11, 2011)
 "Under the Sea" (March 18, 2011)
 "Lost Elephant" (March 25, 2011)
 "The Three Ducketeers" (Easter Day 2011)
 "Loch Ness" (April 8, 2011)
 "Super-Frog" (April 15, 2011)
 "The Dogsitters" (September 12, 2011)
 "The Bird Olympics" (December 30, 2011)
 "Dustbusters" (December 31, 2011)
 "Magicians" (May 12, 2012)
 "The Platypus" (June 19, 2012)
 "Rocks" (August 20, 2012)
 "Deserted Island" (December 30, 2012)
 "Donnie Quixote" (April 6, 2013)
 "Butterfinger" (May 5, 2013)
 "The Computer Bug" (June 6, 2013)
 "The Extraterrestrials" (June 7, 2013)
 "The Quiz Show Planet" (September 15, 2013)
 "The Yeti" (October 6, 2013)
 "Bert the Pigeon" (October 7, 2013)

Video releases
In the United States, six episodes were released on Sesame Street: Count on Sports (Tiny Town, Inventors, Mountain Climbers and Cavemen), Pirates: Elmo and the Bookaneers (Pirates) and Sesame Street: 40 Years of Sunny Days (Penguin). On April 6, 2010, Bert and Ernie's Great Adventures was released for the first time on DVD in the United States by Warner Home Video. The episodes on the 2010 DVD release of Bert and Ernie's Great Adventures includes "Pirates", "Deep Sea", "Tiny Town", "Planet Bert", "Cavemen", "Mountain Climbers", "Penguins", "Ernlock Holmes", "Rainforest", "Bakers", "Wizards", "Three Wishes" and "Kung Fu". If "Play All" is selected, the opening only appears at the beginning of the program, but the opening appears before each sketch if selected individually. Each segment also begins with the segment's title appearing.

In the United Kingdom and Australia, thirteen episodes were released on Bert & Ernie's Great Adventures: Pirates (Pirates, Mountain Climbers, Wizards with Elmo, Penguins, 3 Wishes, Wild West, Rainforest, Deep Sea, Ernlock Holmes, Cavemen, Bakers, Pigeonia and Cliptecs). The DVD was distributed in the United Kingdom by Abbey Home Media and in Australia by Madman Entertainment.

External links

Sesame Street segments
Sesame Street
2000s American animated television series
2010s American animated television series
2000s preschool education television series
2010s preschool education television series
2006 American television series debuts
2013 American television series endings
American children's animated adventure television series
American preschool education television series
American stop-motion animated television series
Animated preschool education television series
Clay animation television series